Eva-Maria Houben (born 15 January 1955) is a German composer, organist, pianist, musicologist and university lecturer.

Life 
Born in Rheinberg, Houben grew up in Kamp-Lintfort. There, Houben provided the organ service during her secondary school time. After her Abitur she studied school music at the Folkwang University of the Arts (1974–78) and artistic organ playing with Gisbert Schneider (1978–80). Her teachers at the Folkwang Hochschule also included Mauricio Rosenmann Taub (music theory) and Ludger Maxsein (piano).

From 1978 to 1982 Houben was organist at the Evangelische Stadtkirche Dinslaken and applied to German Studies and musicology at the University of Duisburg-Essen.

After obtaining her doctorate (1986, with Norbert Linke) and her habilitation (1990) in musicology, Houben became a lecturer at the University of Duisburg (1987–93) and the Robert Schumann Hochschule (1992/93). In 1993 she was appointed professor at the Institute for Music and Musicology of the Technical University Dortmund. Her research and teaching focuses on music theory and contemporary musik. She organizes concerts with compositions by students, who are also given the opportunity to exchange ideas with experienced colleagues in her series of Composer Portraits (since 1993 among others with Nikolaus Brass, Violeta Dinescu, Vinko Globokar and Adriana Hölszky).

Houben has published regularly in magazines (Neue Musikzeitung, Neue Zeitschrift für Musik, Das Orchester) and has performed as organist and pianist (among others in the piano series at the ).

Compositional aesthetics and practice 
Listening to delicate dynamics up to silence, the sensitization for sound processes and perceptual processes play a central role in Houben's musical thinking. She also plays pieces by John Cage as a pianist.

The compositions of Houben are published by the Edition Wandelweiser; in the Wandelweiser Komponisten Ensemble she works with Antoine Beuger, Burkhard Schlothauer, Jürg Frey, Radu Malfatti among others. Her special interest lies beyond these integrative performance projects, in which musicians and amateur work together, and the creation of Raumklang-installations, which at a certain location (for example in a church) point the way ahead to an upcoming concert or allow it to resonate afterwards.

Quote

Publications 
 Violeta Dinescu.
 Musikalische Praxis als Lebensform : Sinnfindung und Wirklichkeitserfahrung beim Musizieren.
 Die Aufhebung der Zeit : zur Utopie unbegrenzter Gegenwart in der Musik des 20. Jahrhunderts.
 Gelb : neues Hören ; Vinko Globokar, Hans-Joachim Hespos, Adriana Hölszky.
 Jürg Frey : Werkbetrachtungen, Reflexionen, Gespräche.

References

Further reading 
 Burkhard Sauerwald: Eva-Maria Houben. In Komponisten der Gegenwart. Edited by Hanns-Werner Heister and Walter-Wolfgang Sparrer. , Munich 1992ff. 41st additional delivery 2/10 (February 2010). 
 Violeta Dinescu (ed.): Begegnungen mit Musik unserer Zeit. Komponisten-Colloquium of the University of Oldenburg 1996–2011. Pfau Verlag, Saarbrücken 2011, .

External links 
 
 
 

20th-century classical composers
German composers
German classical organists
German classical pianists
Women musicologists
20th-century German musicologists
German music educators
Academic staff of the Technical University of Dortmund
1955 births
Living people
Musicians from North Rhine-Westphalia